The grey parrot (Psittacus erithacus), also known as the Congo grey parrot, Congo African grey parrot or African grey parrot, is an Old World parrot in the family  Psittacidae. The Timneh parrot (Psittacus timneh) once was identified as a subspecies of the grey parrot, but has since been elevated to a full species.

Taxonomy
The grey parrot was formally described in 1758 by the Swedish naturalist Carl Linnaeus in the tenth edition of his Systema Naturae. He placed it with all the other parrots in the genus Psittacus and coined the binomial name Psittacus erithacus. Linnaeus erroneously specified the type locality as "Guinea": the locality was later designated as Ghana in West Africa.  The genus name is Latin for "parrot". The specific epithet erithacus is Latin and is derived from the Ancient Greek  εριθακος (erithakos) for an unknown bird that was said to mimic human sounds, perhaps the black redstart. The species is monotypic: no subspecies are recognised.

The Timneh parrot was formerly treated as a subspecies of the grey parrot but is now considered to be a separate species based mainly on the results from a genetic and morphological study published in 2007. Although Linnaeus placed all the parrots known to him in the genus Psittacus, only the grey parrot and the Timneh parrot are now assigned to this genus.

Description

The grey parrot is a medium-sized, predominantly grey, black-billed parrot. The grey colour on the head and wings is generally darker than its body. The head and body feathers have slight white edges. The tail feathers are red.

Due to selection by parrot breeders, some grey parrots are partly or completely red. Both sexes appear similar. The colouration of juveniles is similar to that of adults, but typically their eyes are dark grey to black, in comparison to the yellow irises around dark pupils of the adult birds, and their undertail coverts are tinged with grey. Adults weigh .

Grey parrots may live for 40–60 years in captivity, although their mean lifespan in the wild appears to be shorter—approximately 23 years. They start breeding at an age of 3–5 years and lay 3-5 eggs per brood.

Distribution and habitat
The grey parrot is native to equatorial Africa, including Angola, Cameroon, the Congo, Gabon, Ivory Coast, Ghana, Kenya, and Uganda. The species is found inside a range from Kenya to the eastern part of the Ivory Coast. Current estimates for the global population are uncertain and range from 630,000 to 13 million birds. Populations are decreasing worldwide. The species seems to favor dense forests, but can also be found at forest edges and in more open vegetation types, such as gallery and savanna forests.

A population study published in 2015 found that the species had been "virtually eliminated" from Ghana with numbers declining 90 to 99% since 1992. They were found in only 10 of 42 forested areas, and three roosts that once held 700–1200 birds each, now had only 18 in total. Local people mainly blamed the pet trade and the felling of timber for the decline. Populations are thought to be stable in Cameroon. In the Congo, an estimated 15,000 are taken every year for the pet trade, from the eastern part of the country, although the annual quota is stated to be 5,000.

Grey parrots have escaped or been deliberately released into Florida, U.S., but no evidence indicates that the population is breeding naturally.

Behaviour and ecology

Wild bird behaviours
Little is known about the behaviours and activities of these birds in the wild. In addition to a lack of research funding, it can be particularly difficult to study these birds in wild situations due to their status as prey animals, which leads them to have rather secretive personalities. It has been shown that wild greys may also imitate a wide variety of sounds they hear, much like their captive relatives. Two greys were recorded while roosting in Zaire and researchers reported that they had a repertoire of over 200 different sounds, including nine imitations of other wild bird songs and one of a bat.

Diet

They are mostly frugivorous as most of their diet consists of fruit, nuts, and seeds. The species prefers oil palm fruit and they eat flowers and tree bark, as well as insects and snails. In the wild, the grey parrot is partly a ground feeder. In captivity, they may be fed bird pellets, a variety of fruits such as pear, orange, pomegranate, apple, and banana, and vegetables such as carrot, cooked sweet potato, celery, fresh kale, peas, and green beans. They also need a source of calcium.

Breeding
Grey parrots are monogamous breeders who nest in tree cavities. Each mated pair of parrots needs their own tree for their nest. The hen lays three to five eggs, which she incubates for 30 days while being fed by her mate. The adults defend their nesting sites.

Grey parrot chicks require feeding and care from their parents in the nest. The parents take care of them until 4–5 weeks after they are fledged. Young leave the nest at the age of 12 weeks. Little is known about the courtship behavior of this species in the wild. They weigh  at hatching and  when they leave their parents.

Diseases
Young grey parrots are more commonly infected by psittacine beak and feather disease than adults. Infected birds may show symptoms such as loss of appetite, fluffy feathers, sluggishness, and reduced walking abilities due to brittle bones. Also, grey parrots are more likely to have rhinitis which is an inflammatory and infectious disease of the nasal cavity. Birds may exhibit signs like wheezing, sneezing, nasal snuffling, and swelling or occlusion of the nares. Treatment options include gentle debridement and nasal irrigation.

Conservation
Natural predators for this species include palm-nut vultures and several raptors. Monkeys target eggs and the young for food. Grey parrots in captivity have been observed to be susceptible to fungal infections, bacterial infections, nutritional insufficiency, malignant tumors, psittacine beak and feather disease, tapeworms, and blood-worms.

Humans are by far the largest threat to wild grey populations. Between 1994 and 2003, more than 359,000 grey parrots were traded on the international market. Approximately 21% of the wild population was being harvested every year. Mortality rates are extremely high between the time they are captured and they reach the market, ranging from 60 to 66%. This species also is hunted for its meat and for its body parts, which are used in traditional medicines. As a result of the extensive harvest of wild birds, in addition to habitat loss, this species is believed to be undergoing a rapid decline in the wild and therefore, has been rated as endangered by the International Union for Conservation of Nature.

In October 2016, the Convention on the International Trade of Endangered Fauna and Flora (CITES) extended the highest level of protection to grey parrots by listing the species under Appendix 1, which regulates international trade in the species.

In 2021, the Kenyan government held a short amnesty, during which grey parrot owners could pay a fee to obtain a permit for their birds and facilitate legal ownership. Following the expiry of this time period, it is now illegal to own this species without a permit.

Relationship to humans
The species is common in captivity and regularly kept by humans as a companion parrot, prized for its ability to mimic human speech, which makes it one of the most popular avian pets. An escaped pet in Japan was returned to his owner after repeating the owner's name and address.

Grey parrots are notorious for mimicking noises heard in their environment and using them tirelessly. They are highly intelligent birds, needing extensive behavioral and social enrichment as well as extensive attention in captivity or else they may become distressed. Feather plucking is a common symptom seen among such distressed grey parrots, affecting up to 40% of captive individuals. They may also be prone to behavioural problems due to their sensitive nature. Social isolation hastens stress and aging.

The grey parrot is a highly social species which relies on a flock-type structure, even when raised in captivity. Because they are so dependent on the other birds within their flock, much of their speech and vocal ability is acquired through interaction with the humans with whom they reside. Both wild and captive parrots have been shown to use contact calls, which allow them to interact with their flock mates and communicate information about their location, detection of predators, availability of food, and safety status. In addition, contact calls are used to form strong social bonds with their flock mates, or in the case of captive greys, with their human housemates. In captivity, they have been shown to display communicative competence, meaning they not only use human language correctly, but also in such a way that is appropriate for the social situation which they are in.

Intelligence and cognition
Grey parrots are highly intelligent and are considered by many to be one of the most intelligent species of psittacines. Many individuals have been shown to perform at the cognitive level of a four- to six-year-old human child in some tasks. Several studies have been conducted, indicating a suite of higher-level cognitive abilities. Experiments have shown that grey parrots can learn number sequences and can learn to associate human voices with the faces of the humans who create them. It has been reported that grey parrots are capable of using existing known English words to create new labels for objects which the bird does not know the name. For example "banerry" ("banana" + "cherry") for "apple", "banana crackers" for "dried banana chips" or "yummy bread" for "cake".

The American scientist Irene Pepperberg's research with Alex the parrot showed his ability to learn more than 100 words, differentiating between objects, colours, materials and shapes. Pepperberg spent several decades working with Alex, and wrote numerous scientific papers on experiments performed, indicating his advanced cognitive abilities. One such study found that Alex had the ability to add numbers as well as having a zero-like concept, similar to that of young children and apes.

In addition to their striking cognitive abilities, grey parrots have displayed altruistic behavior and concern for others. Researchers found that while blue-headed macaws were unlikely to share a nut with other members of their own species, grey parrots would actively give their conspecific partner a nut, even if it meant that they would not be able to get one themselves. When the roles were reversed, their partners were overwhelmingly likely to return the favor, foregoing their own nut to their partner's benefits. This indicates not only a display of selflessness but also an act of reciprocity.

A 2012 study demonstrated that captive grey parrots have individual musical preferences. When presented with the opportunity to choose between two different pieces of music via a touch screen monitor located in their cage, the two birds in the test consistently chose different songs, to which they then danced and sang along. Some pet grey parrots have also been observed using the music feature of smart speakers (such as Alexa or Amazon Echo) to verbally request playback of specific favored songs.

Some research has shown that foot preference can be linked to the number of words a particular parrot may know and use. Researchers found that grey parrots who prefer to use their right foot showed a marked increase in the number of words within their lexicon as compared to parrots who were left-footed. Scientists postulate that parrots may have lateralization of brain function, much like mammals do.

Mutations
Grey mutations occur naturally in the wild, such as the Blue Ino (albino), the Incomplete Ino, and the Blue varietals. The Blue Ino is all white. The Incomplete Ino has light pigmentation. The Blue has a white tail.

Breeders from South Africa, Australia, New Zealand, and Scandinavia have bred greys intensively since the 1800s. These bred varieties include the Red Pied, F2 Pied, Grizzles, Ino, Incomplete, Parino, Lutino, Cinnamon, and Red Factor. South African bird breeder Von van Antwerpen and New Zealand partner Jaco Bosman selected F2 Pieds and created the first Red Factor Greys. They are rare, may be predominantly red-pigmented, and vary in price depending upon the extent of the red plumage displayed.

References

External links

grey parrot
Talking birds
grey parrot
Birds of the African tropical rainforest
Birds of the Gulf of Guinea
Animal intelligence
Species endangered by the pet trade
grey parrot
grey parrot